Winnold House, formerly the Benedictine Priory of St Winwaloe, is a country house in the parish of Wereham in Norfolk, England.  The house is constructed from the remaining fragments of a former Benedictine priory. The priory was founded in 1199 and was dissolved in 1321. It was demolished in 1539, and the surviving fragments were incorporated into a house sometime in the 17th century; it was rebuilt in the mid-19th century. It is a Grade II* listed building.

History 

The priory of Wereham was founded by the earls of Clare during the reign of Richard I in the late twelfth century. It was dedicated to Winwaloe (a.k.a.  Guenolo), a Breton saint who flourished about 550 CE, and whose body was enshrined in the Abbey of St Salvius and St Winwaloe, Monsterol (Montreuil) in the diocese of Amiens in France. It was an alien priory of Monsterol.

The earliest extant deed of the priory is one of 1199, whereby L., prior of Saint Winwaloe, with the consent and advice of his brother, Remigius, abbot of Monsterol, granted a toft and eleven acres to Robert de Stradesete. In 1270 there was an exchange of lands in Wereham between the abbot and convent of Wereham and the abbot and convent of Saint Salvin's of Monsterol, acting on behalf of the priory of Saint Winwaloe. At the time, the priory held lands in three Norfolk parishes, with the annual value of £7.

In 1321, the abbot and convent of Monsterol sold the priory to Hugh Scarlet of Lincoln, who conveyed it to Elizabeth de Clare, the foundress of Clare College, Cambridge. In 1336 she conveyed the manor and lands of the priory to the abbot and convent of West Dereham on the condition that he would find a chaplain to say daily mass in the chapel of Saint Winwaloe for the souls of Gilbert, earl of Clare, and of Elizabeth and her ancestors and heirs forever. Ten years later Elizabeth granted the custody of the priory to her friend, John de Brauncestre.

At the dissolution the manor of Winwaloe, late belonging to the abbey of Wereham, came to the crown, and was granted to Thomas Guybon and William Mynn.

A large fair was held on St Winnold's Day (3 March); the fair moved to Downham Market in 1798.

Architecture 
The remains of the priory can be seen on many of the walls of the house.

Design 
The priory's stonework is ashlar and coping, and the roof is composed of slate. South front of two storeys in two bays. 20th-century door and porch to left. Windows are 3-light cross casements under re-used square hoods on head stops. Triangular stops to first floor casements. Moulded ashlar eaves cornice below gabled roof with 19th-century internal end stacks carrying twin octagonal gault brick flues. Gable ends on kneelers. East wall with remains of external stack, flat buttress to left and clasping buttress to right, the latter being the remains of a 12th-century pier: single shaft to left and on north face multi-shafted above set-off. Two set-offs to east gable wall, remains of one C12 lancet and C17 attic window. North elevation with 12th-century string course at first floor, flat central buttress and remains of annulated engaged column to right. Three inserted casements and door. Dentil eaves cornice. To west an early C19 brick and ashlar extension of two storeys. 19th- and 20th-century casements, gabled slate roof and ridge stack right of centre with paired octagonal gault brick flues.

Notes

References 
Doubleday, Herbert Arthur (1906). "Religious Houses: The Priory of St. Winwalloe, Wereham" (PDF). A History of the County of Norfolk. 2. Institute of Historical Research. pp. 465–466. Archived on 20 December 2008. Retrieved 7 October 2010.

Country houses in Norfolk
King's Lynn and West Norfolk
Alien priories in England